Port Reading is a census-designated place and unincorporated community located within Woodbridge Township, in Middlesex County, New Jersey. As of the 2010 U.S. census, Port Reading's population was 3,728.

History
Port Reading was built in the late 19th century by the Reading Railroad of Pennsylvania to serve their shipping needs, especially coal from the Pennsylvania anthracite coal fields. In 1892 Port Reading was connected to the Reading Railroad system via a new branch line from Port Reading Junction near Bound Brook, New Jersey, known as the Port Reading Secondary. The Port Reading Refinery was located in the district.

Geography
According to the U.S. Census Bureau, Port Reading had a total area of 2.898 square miles (7.506 km2), including 2.243 square miles (5.809 km2) of land and 0.655 square miles (1.697 km2) of water (22.61%).

Port Reading lies along the Arthur Kill waterway that separates New Jersey from Staten Island, New York.

Demographics

Census 2010

Census 2000
As of the 2000 United States census there were 3,829 people, 1,337 households, and 1,069 families living in the CDP. The population density was 663.2/km2 (1,717.6/mi2). There were 1,357 housing units at an average density of 235.0/km2 (608.7/mi2). The racial makeup of the CDP was 90.99% White, 2.61% African American, 2.40% Asian, 1.78% from other races, and 2.22% from two or more races. Hispanic or Latino of any race were 7.57% of the population.

There were 1,337 households, out of which 33.3% had children under the age of 18 living with them, 61.2% were married couples living together, 13.2% had a female householder with no husband present, and 20.0% were non-families. 16.2% of all households were made up of individuals, and 7.3% had someone living alone who was 65 years of age or older. The average household size was 2.86 and the average family size was 3.21.

In the CDP the population was spread out, with 23.3% under the age of 18, 7.1% from 18 to 24, 29.8% from 25 to 44, 23.8% from 45 to 64, and 16.0% who were 65 years of age or older. The median age was 39 years. For every 100 females, there were 95.9 males. For every 100 females age 18 and over, there were 93.4 males.

The median income for a household in the CDP was $58,945, and the median income for a family was $64,259. Males had a median income of $50,142 versus $30,283 for females. The per capita income for the CDP was $23,978. About 1.7% of families and 3.2% of the population were below the poverty line, including 5.1% of those under age 18 and 2.0% of those age 65 or over.

Education
Public school

Elementary school (K-6)
 Port Reading School #9

See also
List of neighborhoods in Woodbridge Township, New Jersey
List of neighborhoods in Edison, New Jersey

References

External links
 McMyler Coal Dumper - Built in 1917, located in Port Reading, New Jersey
 City Data on Port Reading, NJ

Neighborhoods in Woodbridge Township, New Jersey
Census-designated places in Middlesex County, New Jersey
Ports and harbors of New Jersey
Jersey Shore communities in Middlesex County